Rashaan Malik Gaulden (born January 23, 1995) is an American football safety who is currently a member of the Calgary Stampeders of the Canadian Football League (CFL). He played college football at Tennessee, and was drafted by the Carolina Panthers in the third round of the 2018 NFL Draft.

Early years
Gaulden attended Independence High School in Thompson's Station, Tennessee. Along with football, he also participated in track and field and was named an All-American after finishing fourth nationally in the 4x400 relay. During his senior football season, he recorded 193 tackles. Gaulden committed to play football for the Tennessee Volunteers on July 20, 2013,
choosing the Volunteers over programs such as Vanderbilt and South Carolina.

College career
Gaulden played at the University of Tennessee from 2014 to 2017 under head coach Butch Jones. As a true freshman in 2014, Gaulden played in 11 games, making seven total tackles.

Gaulden missed the 2015 season due to a foot injury suffered during training camp in August and took a medical redshirt.

Gaulden returned in 2016 as a redshirt sophomore and played in all 13 of Tennessee's games, recording 68 tackles (six for loss), four pass breakups and one forced fumble.

As a redshirt junior in 2017, Gaulden played in all 12 games of the season, tallying 65 tackles, one interception, five pass deflections, and three forced fumbles. His interception was the first of his collegiate career and came against the Florida Gators in a 26–20 loss. After the season, he declared for the 2018 NFL Draft.

Professional career
On January 3, 2018, Gaulden released a statement through his Twitter account, announcing his decision to forgo his senior season and enter the 2018 NFL Draft. He attended the NFL Scouting Combine in Indianapolis and completed all of the combine and positional drills. His 40-yard dash time was described as "not great" by NFL analyst Daniel Jeremiah, but Gaulden managed to perform well and show his agility in positional drills.

On March 19, 2018, Gaulden participated at Tennessee's pro day and weighed in at 191 lbs, which was six pounds lighter than his weight at the NFL Combine. He ran the 40-yard dash (4.69s), 20-yard dash (2.78s), 10-yard dash (1.64s), and short shuttle (4.26s). At the conclusion of the pre-draft process, Gaulden was projected to be a second round pick by NFL draft experts and scouts. He was ranked as the second best free safety prospect in the draft by DraftScout.com, was ranked the 10th best cornerback by Sports Illustrated, and was ranked the 13th best cornerback in the draft by Scouts Inc.

Carolina Panthers
The Carolina Panthers selected Gaulden in the third round (85th overall) of the 2018 NFL Draft, through a pick traded from the Buffalo Bills for Kelvin Benjamin. He was the seventh safety drafted in 2018.

On May 12, 2018, the Carolina Panthers signed Gaulden to a four-year, $3.44 million contract that includes a signing bonus of $847,656. On November 25, 2019, Gaulden was waived by the Panthers.

New York Giants
On December 4, 2019, Gaulden was signed to the New York Giants practice squad. He was promoted to the active roster on December 18, 2019. He was waived on August 2, 2020.

Gaulden had a tryout with the Pittsburgh Steelers on August 17, 2020, and with the Tennessee Titans on August 23, 2020.

Las Vegas Raiders
On November 9, 2020, the Las Vegas Raiders signed Gaulden to their practice squad. He was elevated to the active roster on December 17 and December 26 for the team's weeks 15 and 16 games against the Los Angeles Chargers and Miami Dolphins, and reverted to the practice squad after each game. He signed a reserve/future contract on January 5, 2021. He was waived on June 4, 2021.

Calgary Stampeders 
On September 27, 2022 Gaulden signed with the Calgary Stampeders of the Canadian Football League (CFL).

References

External links
New York Giants bio
Carolina Panthers bio
Tennessee Volunteers bio

1995 births
Living people
American football cornerbacks
People from Spring Hill, Tennessee
Players of American football from Tennessee
Tennessee Volunteers football players
Carolina Panthers players
New York Giants players
Las Vegas Raiders players